The Movie Hero is a 2003 American romantic comedy film starring Jeremy Sisto, Dina Meyer, and Peter Stormare. It was written and directed by Brad T. Gottfred.

Concept
The concept of the film is that the protagonist is aware his life is a movie. He meets many people throughout his "storyline" including his audience, whom he talks to frequently, his sidekick, a woman he immediately calls his Love Interest, and a shady character known only as Suspicious Character whom he suspects to be villainous. The movie won the Audience Award at the Austin Film Festival as well as numerous awards from festivals around the country. It premiered on DVD and the Showtime Cable channel in 2006.

References

External links 
 
 

 

2003 films
2003 romantic comedy films
American romantic comedy films
2000s English-language films
2000s American films